2,2-Dimethylpropanoyl chloride is a branched-chain acyl chloride. It was first made by Aleksandr Butlerov in 1874 by reacting pivalic acid with phosphorus pentachloride.

Pivaloyl chloride is used as an input in the manufacture of some drugs, insecticides and herbicides.

References

Acyl chlorides
Reagents for organic chemistry